Alexandre Martinović (born 31 May 1985 in Montbéliard, Doubs) is a retired football goalkeeper.

Club career
He began his career by FC Sochaux-Montbéliard was 2002 promoted to first team, before in July 2006 joined to K.A.A. Gent, he played there three games in 3 years and moved on loan to FCV Dender in July 2008.

References

External links

Footgoal Profile

1985 births
Living people
Sportspeople from Montbéliard
French people of Montenegrin descent
Association football goalkeepers
French footballers
FC Sochaux-Montbéliard players
K.A.A. Gent players
F.C.V. Dender E.H. players
Hakoah Maccabi Ramat Gan F.C. players
Maccabi Netanya F.C. players
FC La Chaux-de-Fonds players
Ligue 1 players
Liga Leumit players
Israeli Premier League players
Swiss 1. Liga (football) players
French expatriate footballers
Expatriate footballers in Belgium
French expatriate sportspeople in Belgium
Expatriate footballers in Israel
French expatriate sportspeople in Israel
Expatriate footballers in Switzerland
French expatriate sportspeople in Switzerland
Footballers from Bourgogne-Franche-Comté